Con Houlihan (6 December 1925 – 4 August 2012) was an Irish sportswriter. Despite only progressing to national journalism at the age of 46, he became "the greatest and the best-loved Irish sports journalist of all".

Journalism career
Over a lengthy career, Houlihan covered many Irish and international sporting events, from Gaelic football and hurling finals, to soccer and rugby World Cups, the Olympics and numberless race meetings inside and outside Ireland.

He was a journalist with the Irish Press group writing for The Irish Press, Evening Press and sometimes The Sunday Press, until the group's demise in 1995. He wrote the "Tributaries" column and Evening Press back sports page "Con Houlihan" column.

Death
Houlihan died in the morning of 4 August 2012 in St James's Hospital in Dublin. Often considered one of Ireland's finest writers, he left behind a legacy of immense sports journalism that spanned over 60 years. A minute's silence was observed in his memory ahead of Kerry's All-Ireland Senior Football Championship quarter-final defeat to Donegal at Croke Park the following day. His last column, in which he wished Katie Taylor well, was published the day after his death. His funeral took place on 8 August 2012.

Awards and honours
A bronze bust of Houlihan was unveiled in his hometown of Castleisland in 2004. In 2011, a bronze plaque was installed outside The Palace bar in Dublin. The sculpture is in the foyer of The Bank pub on College Green. Cons Corner and a Bronze Bust with a quote are in The Palace Bar.

List of works
 More Than a Game
 A Harvest: New, Rare and Uncollected Essays
 Close the Wicket Gate: Tales from the Kilmichael Bar Foreword for Johanna O'Mahony Walters
 Death of a King and Other Stories
 In So Many Words: The Best of Con Houlihan
 Windfalls

References

External links
 Con Houlihan Independent.ie
 

1925 births
2012 deaths
Evening Press people
Gaelic games journalists
Irish columnists
The Irish Press people
Irish Independent people
Irish sportswriters
People from Castleisland
The Sunday Press people